The Nissan AZEAL was a concept car first released to the public at the 2005 North American International Auto Show. The concept is a sports coupé aimed at young drivers. The Azeal features trendy gadgetry, like an integrated cell phone and an MP3 player. The car's goals are to place emphasis on personality and aggressive styling as well as blend affordability with desirability. Penned by designers Ken Lee and David Wong, it is the first Nissan to come out of its new Farmington Hills, Michigan (Metro Detroit) design centre.

The AZEAL has a turbocharged 2.5-litre, 4-cylinder engine with a 6-speed manual transmission equipped with a limited-slip differential. It is front-wheel drive. No further information on the car has been released by Nissan yet. Exterior features of the AZEAL include 19" aluminum-alloy wheels, dual exhaust pipes, side skirts and a spoiler topped off with glass roof panels like those found in the Nissan Maxima and Nissan Quest.
Much of the exterior design for AZEAL went into the production version of 2007 Nissan Sentra.

References

External links
 Nissan Connexion

AZEAL